In geometry, the rhombitrihexagonal tiling is a semiregular tiling of the Euclidean plane. There are one triangle, two squares, and one hexagon on each vertex. It has Schläfli symbol of rr{3,6}.

John Conway calls it a rhombihexadeltille. It can be considered a cantellated by Norman Johnson's terminology or an expanded hexagonal tiling by Alicia Boole Stott's operational language.

There are 3 regular and 8 semiregular tilings in the plane.

Uniform colorings 
There is only one uniform coloring in a rhombitrihexagonal tiling. (Naming the colors by indices around a vertex (3.4.6.4): 1232.)

With edge-colorings there is a half symmetry form (3*3) orbifold notation. The hexagons can be considered as truncated triangles, t{3} with two types of edges. It has Coxeter diagram , Schläfli symbol s2{3,6}. The bicolored square can be distorted into isosceles trapezoids. In the limit, where the rectangles degenerate into edges, a triangular tiling results, constructed as a snub triangular tiling, .

Examples

Related tilings 
There is one related 2-uniform tiling, having hexagons dissected into 6 triangles.   The rhombitrihexagonal tiling is also related to the truncated trihexagonal tiling by replacing some of the hexagons and surrounding squares and triangles with dodecagons:

Circle packing 
The rhombitrihexagonal tiling can be used as a circle packing, placing equal diameter circles at the center of every point. Every circle is in contact with 4 other circles in the packing (kissing number). The translational lattice domain (red rhombus) contains 6 distinct circles.

Wythoff construction
There are eight uniform tilings that can be based from the regular hexagonal tiling (or the dual triangular tiling).

Drawing the tiles colored as red on the original faces, yellow at the original vertices, and blue along the original edges, there are 8 forms, 7 which are topologically distinct. (The truncated triangular tiling is topologically identical to the hexagonal tiling.)

Symmetry mutations
This tiling is topologically related as a part of sequence of cantellated polyhedra with vertex figure (3.4.n.4), and continues as tilings of the hyperbolic plane. These vertex-transitive figures have (*n32) reflectional symmetry.

Deltoidal trihexagonal tiling 

The deltoidal trihexagonal tiling is a dual of the semiregular tiling known as the rhombitrihexagonal tiling. Conway calls it a tetrille. The edges of this tiling can be formed by the intersection overlay of the regular triangular tiling and a hexagonal tiling. Each kite face of this tiling has angles 120°, 90°, 60° and 90°. It is one of only eight tilings of the plane in which every edge lies on a line of symmetry of the tiling.

The deltoidal trihexagonal tiling is a dual of the semiregular tiling rhombitrihexagonal tiling. Its faces are deltoids or kites.

Related polyhedra and tilings 

It is one of 7 dual uniform tilings in hexagonal symmetry, including the regular duals.

This tiling has face transitive variations, that can distort the kites into bilateral trapezoids or more general quadrilaterals. Ignoring the face colors below, the fully symmetry is p6m, and the lower symmetry is p31m with 3 mirrors meeting at a point, and 3-fold rotation points.

This tiling is related to the trihexagonal tiling by dividing the triangles and hexagons into central triangles and merging neighboring triangles into kites.

The deltoidal trihexagonal tiling is a part of a set of uniform dual tilings, corresponding to the dual of the rhombitrihexagonal tiling.

Symmetry mutations
This tiling is topologically related as a part of sequence of tilings with face configurations V3.4.n.4, and continues as tilings of the hyperbolic plane. These face-transitive figures have (*n32) reflectional symmetry.

Other deltoidal (kite) tiling 
Other deltoidal tilings are possible.

Point symmetry allows the plane to be filled by growing kites, with the topology as a square tiling, V4.4.4.4, and can be created by crossing string of a dream catcher. Below is an example with dihedral hexagonal symmetry.

Another face transitive tiling with kite faces, also a topological variation of a square tiling and with face configuration V4.4.4.4. It is also vertex transitive, with every vertex containing all orientations of the kite face.

See also 

 Tilings of regular polygons
 List of uniform tilings

Notes

References 
  (Chapter 2.1: Regular and uniform tilings, p. 58-65)
  p40
 John H. Conway, Heidi Burgiel, Chaim Goodman-Strass, The Symmetries of Things 2008,   (Chapter 21, Naming Archimedean and Catalan polyhedra and tilings.
 
 
 
 Keith Critchlow, Order in Space: A design source book, 1970, p. 69-61, Pattern N, Dual p. 77-76, pattern 2
 Dale Seymour and Jill Britton, Introduction to Tessellations, 1989, pp. 50–56, dual p. 116

Euclidean tilings
Isohedral tilings
Semiregular tilings